The Steamworks Brewing Company is a Canadian microbrewery based in Burnaby, British Columbia. Founded in 1995, Steamworks was originally based out of the Gastown brewpub located in the city of Vancouver. In 2013, the current brewery and taproom opened in the neighbouring city of Burnaby.

Products

Steamworks brews a number of beers, some of which are on their tap year round and some that are seasonal. Year round, Steamworks offers their award winning Flagship IPA, signature Pale Ale, Kölsch, Pilsner, India Pale Ale, Black Angel IPA, White Angel IPA, Heroica Red Ale and Imperial Red Ale.

Seasonal and Limited Releases include Blitzen, Oatmeal Stout, Winter White Stout, Pumpkin Ale, Killer Cucumber Ale, Farmhouse Wheat Ale, Frambozen, Hop Attack, and Saison.

As part of a 100th year commemoration, Steamworks brewed Copper Roof Ale, an ESB (extra special bitter) reflecting the copper roof of the original Vancouver Sun building located near Gastown.

In 2016, the brewery won the "Best in Show" category at the B.C. Beer Awards.

See also
Beer in Canada

References

External links
 

Beer brewing companies based in British Columbia
Companies based in Burnaby